The Android recovery mode is a mode of Android used for installing updates. It consists of a Linux kernel with ramdisk on a separate partition from the main Android system.

Recovery mode can be useful when a phone is stuck in a bootloop or when it has been infected with malware.

Enablement 
The way of entering recovery is different for every vendor.

Examples:

 Nexus 7: Volume Up + Volume Down + Power
 Samsung Galaxy S3: Volume Up + Home + Power
 Motorola Droid X: Home + Power
 Samsung Galaxy A10s: Volume Up + Power

Features 
Features of the recovery mode usually include:

 Applying updates using the Android Debug Bridge
 Applying updates from the SD card
 Factory resetting
 Mounting partitions
 Run system test

Custom recovery 
The recovery that is preinstalled on Android can be replaced by other software, such as TWRP or ClockWorkMod. It can include features such as:

 Full backup and restore functionality
 Applying unsigned update packages
 USB mass storage access to SD cards
 Full ADB access, with ADB running as root

See also 

 Bootloader unlocking
 Qualcomm EDL mode

References 

Android (operating system)